Gdańsk Oliwa railway station is a railway station serving the city of Gdańsk, in the Pomeranian Voivodeship, Poland. The station opened in 1870 and is located on the Gdańsk–Stargard railway and the parallel Gdańsk Śródmieście–Rumia railway. The station is located in the Oliwa quarter of the city. The train services are operated by PKP, Przewozy Regionalne and SKM Tricity. Koleje Mazowieckie trains operate here during the summer.

General information
The station was built and opened in 1870 as part of a new railway line from Szczecin to Gdansk. This was the third established railway line in Gdansk (the line Gdańsk-Tczew and the railway line No. 249 to the Port). At the time Oliwa was an independent municipality and had about 3,000 inhabitants. On 1 July 1926, Oliwa was incorporated in the administrative boundaries of the city and the station name was changed to Danzig Oliva.

On 2 January 1952 the SKM Trojmiasto suburban railway was opened, parallel to the existing line.

The station features two island platforms, of which one functions as the regional commuter SKM stop and the other for long-distance services. The platforms are accessible through an underpass of which connects all four platforms. The ticket offices are open all day long.

Modernisation
In late 2008 the platforms of SKM underwent a complete renovation. They restored the historic shelter and pavement, lifts and electronic information boards showing the next departures.

In June 2011 a major renovation of the main line platforms started, this was completed in 2014.

Train services

The station is served by the following services:

EuroCity services (EC) (EC 95 by DB) (IC by PKP) Gdynia - Gdansk - Bydgoszcz - Poznan - Rzepin - Frankfurt (Oder) - Berlin
EuroCity services (EC) Gdynia - Gdansk - Malbork - Warsaw - Katowice - Bohumin - Ostrava - Prerov - Breclav - Vienna
Express Intercity Premium services (EIP) Gdynia - Warsaw
Express Intercity Premium services (EIP) Gdynia - Warsaw - Katowice - Gliwice/Bielsko-Biała
Express Intercity Premium services (EIP) Gdynia/Kołobrzeg - Warsaw - Kraków (- Rzeszów)
Intercity services (IC) Gdynia - Gdansk - Bydgoszcz - Poznań - Wrocław - Opole - Katowice - Kraków - Rzeszów - Przemyśl
Intercity services (IC) Gdynia - Gdańsk - Bydgoszcz - Toruń - Kutno - Łódź - Częstochowa - Katowice - Bielsko-Biała
Intercity services (IC) Gdynia - Gdańsk - Bydgoszcz - Łódź - Czestochowa — Krakow — Zakopane
Intercity services (IC) Gdynia - Gdańsk - Bydgoszcz - Poznań - Zielona Góra
Intercity services (IC) Gdynia - Gdańsk - Bydgoszcz - Poznań - Wrocław 
 Intercity services (IC) Łódź Fabryczna — Warszawa — Gdańsk Glowny — Kołobrzeg
Intercity services (IC) Szczecin - Koszalin - Słupsk - Gdynia - Gdańsk
Intercity services (IC) Szczecin - Koszalin - Słupsk - Gdynia - Gdańsk - Elbląg/Iława - Olsztyn
Intercity services (IC) Szczecin - Koszalin - Słupsk - Gdynia - Gdańsk - Elbląg - Olsztyn - Białystok
Intercity services (TLK) Gdynia Główna — Kostrzyn 
Intercity services (TLK) Gdynia Główna — Warszawa — Krakow — Zakopane 
Intercity services (TLK) Kołobrzeg — Gdynia Główna — Warszawa Wschodnia — Kraków Główny
Regional services (R) Tczew — Gdynia Chylonia 
Regional services (R) Tczew — Słupsk  
Regional services (R) Malbork — Słupsk  
Regional services (R) Malbork — Gdynia Chylonia 
Regional services (R) Elbląg — Gdynia Chylonia 
Regional services (R) Elbląg — Słupsk  
Regional services (R) Chojnice — Tczew — Gdynia Główna 
Regional services (R) Gdynia Chylonia — Olsztyn Główny
Regional services (R) Gdynia Chylonia — Smętowo 
Regional services (R) Gdynia Chylonia — Laskowice Pomorskie 
Regional services (R) Gdynia Chylonia — Bydgoszcz Główna 
Regional services (R) Słupsk — Bydgoszcz Główna 
Regional services (R) Gdynia Chylonia — Pruszcz Gdański 
Pomorska Kolej Metropolitalna services (R) Kościerzyna — Gdańsk Port Lotniczy (Airport) — Gdańsk Wrzeszcz — Gdynia Główna
Szybka Kolej Miejska w Trójmieście services (SKMT) (Lębork  -) Wejherowo - Reda - Rumia - Gdynia - Sopot - Gdansk

References 

 This article is based upon a translation of the Polish language version as of October 2016.

References 

Polish railway stations database 

Railway stations in Poland opened in 1870
Oliwa
Railway stations served by Szybka Kolej Miejska (Tricity)
Railway stations served by Przewozy Regionalne InterRegio